Beth Schwartz is an American television writer. She is known for her work as showrunner on the seventh and eighth season of Arrow, and as a co-showrunner on the Netflix series Sweet Tooth.

Career
She began her career as a production staffer on the J. J. Abrams produced ABC dramedy What About Brian. She later would go on to write an episode ("What About Secret Lovers").

She wrote two episodes of the ABC family drama Brothers & Sisters ("Going Once... Going Twice", "Taking Sides") and one episode of The CW's dramedy/romance Hart of Dixie ("Mistress & Misunderstandings").

Arrow
In summer 2012, Schwartz joined the writers room for the first year DC Comics CW series Arrow. Schwartz was named executive story editor with the commencement of the series' third season. At the start of the fourth season, she was promoted to co-producer.

In April 2018, it was announced that Schwartz would take over as showrunner for the show's seventh season.

For the eighth and final season, Schwartz served as co-showrunner alongside Marc Guggenheim.

Legends of Tomorrow
Schwartz has also written two episodes for the Arrow spin-off Legends of Tomorrow, as well as serving as a consulting producer on the show.

Personal life
Schwartz is  married to director, and former Arrowverse cameraman, Jeff Cassidy.

Filmography

Television

References

External links

American television writers
American television producers
American women television producers
Living people
Year of birth missing (living people)
Place of birth missing (living people)
American women television writers
University of Michigan alumni
Showrunners
21st-century American screenwriters
21st-century American women writers